This is a list of national swimming records for Namibia. These are the fastest times ever swum by a swimmer representing Namibia.
These records are tracked/maintained by Namibia's national swimming federation: Namibia Swimming Federation (NASFED).

All records were set in finals unless noted otherwise.

Long Course (50 m)

Men

Women

Mixed relay

Short course (25 m)

Men

Women

Mixed relay

Notes

References
General
Namibian Long Course Records 9 September 2022 updated
Namibian Short Course Records 29 September 2022 updated
Specific

External links
NASFED official web site

Namibia
Records
Swimming
Swimming